Phillips Flying Ranch Airport  is a public airport located fifteen miles (24.1 km) southeast of the central business district (CBD) of Rockwall, in Rockwall County, Texas, United States. The airport itself is located in Hunt County.

The airport is used solely for general aviation purposes.

Facilities 
Phillips Flying Ranch Airport has one runway:
 Runway 13/31: 3,344 x 50 ft. (1,019 x 15 m), Surface: Turf

References

External links 

Airports in Texas
Airports in the Dallas–Fort Worth metroplex
Transportation in Hunt County, Texas
Buildings and structures in Hunt County, Texas